William Carter Knaak (born September 23, 1984 in Austin, Texas, United States) is an American guitarist and singer-songwriter who has served as a sideman in several bands, released his own albums as a solo artist and frontman, and was the lead guitarist in the alternative rock band Blue October from 2018 to 2022. He currently plays guitar and pedal steel in Parker McCollum's band.

Early life and musical start
Knaak was born and raised in Austin, Texas. His father played piano and fronted his own band Mad Knaak and the Revolution, and also briefly played keyboard in The 13th Floor Elevators. His grandmother played violin, and his uncle was a guitar player. When Will was eleven, his mother died in a house fire. Upon losing their home, Will and his father and brother moved into an apartment in a different neighborhood away from his friends. Mourning the loss of his mother, Will isolated himself in his room and played guitar for several hours every day, learning songs by his favorite bands such as Tripping Daisy, Nirvana, Soundgarden, and Offspring. Will's uncle introduced him to the music of Chuck Berry’s rock ‘n’ roll and country greats such as Waylon Jennings, Merle Haggard, and Willie Nelson, contributing to Will's unique blend of alternative rock and country guitar playing style.

Will and his dad would often dine at the Broken Spoke restaurant in Austin, which hosted live music acts. After a performance at the Spoke, performer Guitar Lynn taught Will the blues scale on guitar and suggested he could use this knowledge to solo with blues bands on nearly any song. As a twelve-year-old, Will soon found himself sitting in at gigs with local players such as Charlie and Will Sexton, Doug Sahm, and Paul Ray of the Cobras. At age thirteen, Will joined the kid band RedHeaded Stepchild along with future Snarky Puppy guitarist Chris McQueen and other classmates. The group played western swing covers, and even wrote some original songs, releasing the album Deep, Wide, & Forever in 1998. Will graduated from Natural Ear Music School in Austin where his teachers included the legendary fiddler Alvin Crow and Texas Music Hall of Famer Johnny X Reed who both promptly invited him to play as sideman at their gigs, and immersed him into the deep history of the Austin blues scene in addition to adding the influences of 50s R&B and surf rock to Knaak's playing. After a year of performing weekly concerts with Reed's band The Nortons, and Crow's group The Pleasant Valley Boys, at age sixteen Will was fronting his own band, Knaak Attack, with bassist Silas Parker and drummer Vincent Ambrosone. Record producer David Dickinson caught one of their shows and offered to produce an album for the group, which they sold on CD-Rs at their concerts throughout their formative years.

When Will was fifteen, the mayor of Austin, Kirk Watson, declared May 24, 2000 as Will Knaak Day, which culminated in Will headlining an outdoor concert in front of five thousand fans at Auditorium Shores. He credits this as the day when he fully committed himself to pursuing a career in music and never looked back.

Music career
Will recorded his first solo album The Only Open Road at Shine Studios in Dripping Springs, Texas with producer Jeff Plankenhorn, longtime guitarist in Bob Schneider’s band. The set was mixed and engineered by Justin Douglas and released on Loungeside Records in February 2016. Knaak's band for the album included drummer Brannen Temple and bassist Yoggie Musgrove. Later in 2016 Will teamed up with a different group of players to record the EP Will Knaak & the Voodoo Exorcists which showcased a hard-edged sound heavily influenced by 90s grunge, The Joshua Tree era U2, Stevie Ray Vaughan, Lenny Kravitz, and Jimi Hendrix. Working with Lance Harvill as producer, the band consisted of Chris Gilbreath on rhythm guitar, Keith Long on bass, and Michael Ferguson on drums. In December 2016 Will's former teenage band The Knaak Attack played a reunion show and enjoyed the experience so much that they went into the studio and recorded an album, independently releasing it in May 2017. The group played a series of concerts that summer to promote the album.

In addition to his solo work, Knaak has been an in-demand sideman and session player in the Austin scene for a diverse array of artists such as Pauline Reese, Jon Wolfe, Melissa Sellers, Lia Catallo, Jane Bond, Royal Southern Brotherhood, Jake Lloyd, Kacy Crowley, Liars & Saints (a supergroup featuring Kacy Crowley, Johnny Goudie and Jeremy Nail), The Esquires, Alpha Rev, Ellie Reed, Grace Sorensen, The Statesboro Revue, Ernie Durawa of the Texas Tornados, rapper Nick Diden, and spoken word poet B. Harold Benton. He played national tours with acts such as Angela Peterson, Johnny Solinger of Skid Row, Parker McCollum, and Wade Bowen and Randy Rogers. Will joined Bowen's band for the tour in support of Bowen's 2014 self-titled album, which included an appearance on Late Night with Conan O'Brien. Knaak then played banjo and guitar on Bowen and Rogers’ 2015 collaborative album Hold My Beer Vol. 1 which peaked at number 4 on the Billboard Country albums chart, and number 3 on Billboard's Independent Albums Chart. He also played on the album's supporting tour "Hold My Beer and Watch This!" and continued as a member of Bowen's band until 2018. Inspired by the birth of his daughter, and unable to tour during the COVID-19 pandemic, Will recorded a solo album Live in Lockdown Vol. 1 which he released via Bandcamp on June 23, 2020. On April 29, 2022 Knaak released a jazz-influenced minimalist instrumental album entitled Lonely Lo-Fi. In November 2022 Knaak launched a kickstarter campaign for his next solo album Dying Day which he described as a "gritty, soulful, bluesy, and roots-based". As of the December 10, 2022 deadline, Knaak had raised over $20,000, with an initial goal of raising $10,000. Knaak aims to record the album by June 2023 and release it before the end of 2023.

In June-July 2022 Will toured as a sideman in Parker McCollum's band, which included several dates opening for Thomas Rhett. Following the tour, he accepted an offer to be full-time guitarist in McCollum's band starting in December 2022.

Blue October and related projects

Through his extensive session work, Will befriended local producer and studio owner Matt Noveskey. When Noveskey's band Blue October found themselves in need of a guitarist in February 2018, Knaak jumped at the opportunity. His first studio work with the band was on the song "King" for their ninth studio album I Hope You're Happy which reached number 28 on the Billboard 200 and number 3 on the Billboard Alternative Albums chart. He also appeared in the music video for the single "Daylight". He toured North America and Europe for Blue October's I Hope You’re Happy tour in 2018–2019, and his first album with the group, Live From Manchester was released in November 2019. In 2020 Will played lead guitar on Blue October's tenth album This is What I Live For and received co-writing credit for the song "Stay with Me". In a 2020 interview, Blue October frontman Justin Furstenfeld said Will Knaak is probably the most talented guitarist Blue October has ever had, calling him a "true professional guitarist". Along with Noveskey and Blue October's drum technician Charley Seiss, Will is also a member of the Ryan Delahoussaye-fronted side project The Meeting Place, which played their first shows in August 2019. He also contributed guitar to Matt Noveskey's side project Icarus Bell, co-writing the band's debut single "Aces".During the summer of 2022 Will toured with Blue October, opening for the Goo Goo Dolls on a three month run which saw the band playing premier amphitheaters across North America. Knaak contributed guitar to part 1 of Blue October's triple album Spinning the Truth Around, and co-wrote the music for two songs, "How Can You Love Me If You Don't Even Like Me?", and "The Kitchen Drawer". Knaak played guitar on the first leg of the album's supporting tour in Fall 2022.

Discography

References

External links

1984 births
Living people
American alternative rock musicians
American male singers
Lead guitarists
American rock guitarists
American blues guitarists
American male guitarists
American rock singers
American blues singers
Electric blues musicians
Texas blues musicians
Blue October members
Musicians from Austin, Texas
Songwriters from Texas
Guitarists from Texas
Singers from Texas
20th-century American guitarists
21st-century American singers
21st-century American guitarists